Yevhen Lozynskyi (born 7 February 1982 in Lviv, Ukrainian SSR, Soviet Union) is a professional Ukrainian football defender who plays for FC Poltava.

Lozynskyi began his playing career with FC Dynamo Kyiv's third team. Than he joined different Ukrainian teams, and in 2008 he signed a contract with FC Obolon Kyiv until 30 June 2012.

References

External links
 Profile at Official FFU site (UKR)

1982 births
Living people
Ukrainian footballers
FC Hoverla Uzhhorod players
FC Metalurh Zaporizhzhia players
FC Obolon-Brovar Kyiv players
FC Zorya Luhansk players
FC Poltava players
Ukrainian Premier League players
Association football defenders
Sportspeople from Lviv